Live from Iraq is a live album by The Charlie Daniels Band released in 2007.  It was recorded during a 2006 USO tour of Iraq in front of U.S. troops.  The CD is accompanied by a DVD featuring a 45-minute documentary of the band's trip to Iraq.

Track listing 
 "Notte Pericolosa" (Charlie Daniels, Chris Wormer) - 0:32
 "In America" (Daniels, Tommy Crain, Taz DiGregorio, Fred Edwards, Charlie Hayward, Jim Marshall) - 3:17
 "The South's Gonna Do It" (Daniels) - 3:38
 "The Legend of Wooley Swamp" (Daniels, Crain, DiGregorio, Edwards, Hayward, Marshall) - 5:28
 "Saddle Tramp" (Daniels, Crain, DiGregorio, Edwards, Hayward, Don Murray) - 10:36
 "Simple Man" (Daniels, DiGregorio, John L. Gavin, Hayward) - 3:29
 "Iraq Blues" (Daniels) - 2:16
 "Floreeda Road" (Daniels) - 9:40
 "Long Haired Country Boy" (Daniels) - 4:42
 "Uneasy Rider" (Daniels) - 5:29
 "How Great Thou Art" (Stuart K. Hine) - 4:18
 "Drinkin' My Baby Goodbye" (Daniels) - 3:40
 "Rocky Top" (Boudleaux & Felice Bryant)- 3:19
 "The Devil Went Down to Georgia" (Daniels, Crain, DiGregorio, Edwards, Hayward, Marshall) - 4:39

Personnel
The Charlie Daniels Band:
Charlie Daniels - Fiddle, guitar, vocals
Joel "Taz" DiGregorio - Piano, B-3 organ, keyboards, vocals
Charlie Hayward - Electric bass
Bruce Brown - Electric guitar, acoustic guitar, vocals
Pat McDonald - drums, percussion
Chris Wormer - Additional guitars

Production
Executive Producer: David Corlew
Produced by: Charlie Daniels & Chris Wormer
Engineered and mixed by: Chris Wormer & Bob Workman
Mixed at Wormaster Studio
Mastered by: Jim DeMain at Yes Master, Nashville, TN
Live recording assistance: CDB International Road Crew - Jimmy Burton, Roger Campbell, Bob Edwards & Bob Workman
Production coordinators: Bebe Evans, Paula Szeigis & Angela Gresham-Wheeler
Art direction: Angela Gresham-Wheeler, Paula Szeigis & Erick Anderson
Cover photo: Randy Harris
Additional photography: Randy Harris, David Corlew & Bebe Evans
Design: Erick Anderson

DVD Production
Produced & directed by: David Corlew
Written by: David Corlew & Jessica Berryman
Edited by: Jessica Berryman
Associate producers: Bebe Evans & Angela Gresham-Wheeler
Videographer: David Corlew
Secondary videographers: Tony Reyes & Jacob Smithson
Remote location manager, grip & best boy: Bebe Evans
Original musical score by: Chris Wormer
Post production supervisor: Read Ridley

Catalog number
CD Catalog Number: Koch Records KOC-CD-4246

Chart performance

Charlie Daniels albums
2007 live albums
Live video albums
2007 video albums